Caldimonas taiwanensis is a bacterium from the genus Caldimonas which has been isolated from a hot spring in Taiwan. Caldimonas taiwanensis produces amylase.

References

Comamonadaceae
Bacteria described in 2005